Hernán Siles Zuazo was inaugurated on 10 October 1982 and formed his cabinet.

MNRI – Revolutionary Nationalist Leftwing Movement

ind – independent

MIR – Revolutionary Left Movement

PCB – Communist Party of Bolivia

PDC – Christian Democratic Party

PRIN – Revolutionary Party of the Nationalist Left

MRTK – Tupaj Katari Revolutionary Movement

mil – military

Notes

Cabinets of Bolivia
Cabinets established in 1982
Cabinets disestablished in 1985
1982 establishments in Bolivia
1985 disestablishments in Bolivia